Left Union may refer to:

 Catalan Left Union, a Spanish electoral coalition in 1986
 Left Union for a Clean and Holy Republic, a Bulgarian electoral coalition in 2021
 Revolutionary Left Union, a Peruvian electoral coalition in 1980
 Union of the Left (Poland), the former name of Freedom and Equality party

See also 
 Union of the Left (disambiguation)